Fayez Al Saeed is an Emirati singer and actor.

Early life
Participated as a jury member in the Gulf Star program, which was shown on Dubai TV. he entered the composing field in 2000 and began by artist Reem Al Mahmoudi in the song (I Change My Mind).

Discography

Albums
 I am Winnie 2016 
 missile 2013 
 Shard 2008
 The problems of 2006 
 Fayez 2003 2003
 Kana 2002 
 Look Into 2001 
 The splendor of 2002 
 Hour promised 1996

Live Festivals 
 Carthage Festival
 Cairo
 Fujairah
 Nights Dubai
 Agadir
 Grandmother
 Salalah
 Sharm El-Shaikh
 Beirut
 Hala February in Kuwait

TV Series
Owner of my heart as (Gamal) was his first series on TV with Shatha Hassoun.

References

Emirati male singers
Emirati male film actors
Living people
People from the Emirate of Sharjah
People from Khor Fakkan
Emirati composers
1974 births
Arabic-language singers